Rory Cochrane (born February 28, 1972) is an American actor. He is known for playing Ron Slater in Dazed and Confused, Lucas in Empire Records, Lee Schatz in Argo, Freck in A Scanner Darkly, and Tim Speedle in CSI: Miami.

Career
Cochrane's first roles included a part in a docudrama about drugs on Saturday Night with Connie Chung (1989) and an appearance in an episode of H.E.L.P. (1990). He then made his film debut (with about fifteen seconds' screen time) in A Kiss Before Dying, followed by his first substantial role as Jeff Goldblum's son in Fathers & Sons.

Cochrane's breakout role came when he was cast as stoner Ron Slater in 1993's Dazed and Confused, a film that Entertainment Weekly ranked #3 in their "50 Best High School Movies" of all-time. Cochrane followed up with a powerful performance as the psychotic Billy Mack in the Renée Zellweger action/comedy Love and a .45 in 1994. Cochrane again found success with a major role in the poorly-received Empire Records and appeared in Hart's War starring Bruce Willis and Colin Farrell. He also appeared in the Richard Linklater film A Scanner Darkly (2006).

Cochrane played the role of CSI Tim Speedle in CSI: Miami seasons 1–3. Cochrane reprised his role as Tim Speedle on CSI: Miami in the episode "Bang, Bang, Your Debt", as a hallucination to Detective Eric Delko in season 6.

In 2015, Cochrane had a supporting role as Boston mobster Stephen Flemmi in the true-crime film Black Mass, which starred Johnny Depp.

Filmography

Film

Television

Video Games

References

External links

 
 

1972 births
Living people
American male film actors
Male actors from New York (state)
Male actors from Syracuse, New York
20th-century American male actors
21st-century American male actors
People from Syracuse, New York
Outstanding Performance by a Cast in a Motion Picture Screen Actors Guild Award winners
American male television actors